Röjeråsen is a small village situated on a ridge 5 kilometres north of Vikarbyn in Dalarna, Sweden.

Geography of Dalarna County